The Schwedt military prison was the only military prison in the German Democratic Republic which was opened in 1968 and was located in the northeastern city of Schwedt. Around half of those detained were for crimes such as assault, theft, but also "anti-state agitation" or defamation of the state, and military crimes such as refusal to obey orders, desertion, or consuming alcohol on duty. Smaller offenses were often used as an excuse to suppress political dissent, the expression of individuality and different thinking and to punish them under the pretext of the rule of law of the GDR.

The facility was fully closed on May 31, 1990. The prison barracks were demolished in the 1990s, while the four-story administration building has occasionally been used as a shelter for the homeless.

References

Bibliography
 
 
  (Berichte aus der Rechtswissenschaft; zugleich: Humboldt-Univ., Diss., Berlin 2003).
 
 
 
 
 
 

Military prisons
Homeless shelters
1968 establishments in Germany
1990 disestablishments in East Germany